Aurum may refer to:

Aurum, the Latin word for gold and the source of its chemical symbol, "Au"
Aurum (liqueur), an Italian liqueur
Aurum Geyser, in the Upper Geyser Basin of Yellowstone
Aurum, Nevada, a ghost town
Aurum Press, a defunct English publishing house, now part of The Quarto Group
Aurum (album), an album by Closterkeller
Aurum, an alien race in the video game Kid Icarus: Uprising

See also
 AURYN, a symbol in The Neverending Story film